Shinwari is a Pashtun surname of the Shinwari tribe. Notable people with the surname include:

Hamza Shinwari (1907–1994), poet
Rafiq Shinwari, singer
Malalai Shinwari
Fazal Hadi Shinwari (1927–2011), Afghan cleric
Usman Shinwari (born 1994), Pakistani cricketer